The Bhutanese is a newspaper based in Bhutan. It was founded by the investigative journalist Tenzing Lamsang in February 2012.  Originally it was published bi-weekly on Wednesdays and Saturdays but, since August 2013, only weekly on Saturdays to focus on a weekly format. The paper is written mainly in English with a Dzongkha language section.

External links
The Bhutanese — official website
The Bhutanese — Facebook page
The Bhutanese newspaper has formally lodged a complaint to the Election Commission of Bhutan

Sources
 The Bhutanese

References 

Newspapers published in Bhutan
English-language newspapers published in Asia
Dzongkha-language newspapers
Publications established in 2012
2012 establishments in Bhutan